Tasisat-e Sadd-e Latian (also Romanized as Ta'sīsāt-e Sadd-e Latyān) is a village in Lavasan-e Bozorg Rural District, Lavasanat District, Shemiranat County, Tehran Province, Iran. At the 2006 census, its population was 341, in 83 families.

References 

Populated places in Shemiranat County